Hurricane Adolph of the 2001 Pacific hurricane season was the first and one of only two East Pacific hurricanes in May to reach Category 4 strength on the Saffir-Simpson Hurricane Scale since record keeping began in the East Pacific, with the other being Amanda of 2014.
Adolph was the first depression of the season, forming on May 25; it became a hurricane three days later. After rapidly intensifying, Adolph became the most powerful storm in terms of maximum sustained winds this season, along with Hurricane Juliette. The storm briefly threatened land before dissipating on June 1, after moving over colder waters.

Meteorological history

On May 7, a tropical wave left the coast of Africa. The wave moved across the Atlantic Ocean showing little signs of development until May 18, when a low pressure center began organizing along the wave over Costa Rica and Panama. The low entered the Pacific Ocean on May 22, and Dvorak classifications—satellite-based intensity estimates—began two days later.

The newly formed depression moved very slowly due to weak steering currents aloft. Moving towards the east-northeast over weak steering currents, the computer models used to predict the movement of the depression varied greatly, with one predicting an eventual Mexican landfall. Located in conditions ideal for tropical development, the developing cyclone formed a central dense overcast, a large area of deep convection. Adolph was in a low wind shear environment with warm sea surface temperatures and as such, the NHC forecasted intensification to hurricane status within two days. Adolph turned northward on May 27, a turn influenced by a mid-level ridge building to the east and southeast, thus causing the tropical storm to approach Mexico. A banding eye feature, a type of eye common in minor hurricanes, became apparent on satellite imagery. Convection around the eye deepened while the eye became more pronounced, and Adolph was upgraded to hurricane strength on May 27. On May 28, the hurricane passed within roughly 165 mi (265 km) of the Mexican coastline the next day, its closest approach to land. Shortly thereafter, Adolph turned westward under the influence of a mid-tropospheric ridge. The high upper-oceanic heat content, good outflow, and lack of vertical shear allowed the hurricane to begin a burst of rapid intensification, dropping 1.46 mbars per hour. While reducing in size, Adolph reached its peak strength of 145 mph (230 km/h) on May 29. Dvorak classifications reported a T-number of 7.0 for Adolph, equivalent to a low-end Category 5 hurricane on the Saffir-Simpson Hurricane Scale. However, because of a lack of data from the storm via Hurricane Hunters, these strength measurements may be disputed.

After peaking in intensity, Adolph weakened while decelerating westward due to an eyewall replacement cycle; by May 30, the winds dropped to 115 mph (185 km/h) as the eyewall became cloud filled and became less distinct. The trend of weakening continued as the eye definition and convection oscillated in presentation. On June 1 Adolph deteriorated into a tropical storm as convection became exposed from the increasingly elongated center. The remaining clouds persisted for a few days before dissipating entirely.

Impact and records

Though Adolph never moved ashore, its close approach to land as well as its slow, unpredictable movement resulted in the issuance of a tropical storm warning and a hurricane watch for southern Mexico around the time when the cyclone attained major hurricane strength. The threat for heavy rainfall was mentioned for areas from Puerto Ángel to Zihuatanejo when Adolph was a depression and later from Acapulco to Lázaro Cárdenas. The government of Mexico expressed concern that rain and  waves from Adolph would affect Oaxaca, Colima, Jalisco, Michoacán, and Guerrero. The hurricane was responsible for the closure of ports in Acapulco to small vessels.

Outside of some reports of rain and heavy surf, no reports of casualties or damages were received in connection with the storm.

When Adolph reached Category 4 strength on May 29, it became the strongest hurricane to form in the East Pacific basin in May, a record not surpassed until 2014's Hurricane Amanda attained peak winds of 155 mph (250 km/h). At that time, Adolph also became first recorded May hurricane to reach Category 4 strength.

Retirement
The name Adolph has subsequently been retired by the World Meteorological Organization, amid concern that future use of the name would be politically insensitive, due to former Nazi dictator Adolf Hitler. It was replaced with Alvin for the 2007 season.

See also

 List of Pacific hurricanes
 List of Category 4 Pacific hurricanes
 Timeline of the 2001 Pacific hurricane season
 Hurricane Amanda (2014)

References

External links

 National Hurricane Center
 National Hurricane Center's advisory archive on Hurricane Adolph
 National Hurricane Center's graphic archive on Hurricane Adolph
 Tropical Cyclone Report for Adolph

2001 Pacific hurricane season
Category 4 Pacific hurricanes
Adolph